Donald Harris Hood (born October 16, 1949) is an American former professional baseball player. He played in the Major League Baseball as a left-handed pitcher from 1973 to 1983 for the Baltimore Orioles, New York Yankees, Cleveland Indians, St. Louis Cardinals, and the Kansas City Royals.

Baseball career
Hood was born in Florence, South Carolina. He pitched as both a starting pitcher and as a relief pitcher during his major league career. Hood was selected in the first round, 17th overall, in the 1969 Major League Baseball Draft by the Baltimore Orioles. He made his major league debut on  July 16, 1973, pitching in relief of starter Jesse Jefferson in a 7–5 Baltimore victory over the Oakland Athletics at Oakland–Alameda County Coliseum. He and Boog Powell were traded to the Cleveland Indians for Dave Duncan and minor league outfielder Alvin McGrew on February 25 1975. He would spend the next four-and-a-half seasons in Cleveland, appearing in a career high 41 games in 1977.

During the 1979 season Hood was traded to the New York Yankees for catcher/designated hitter Cliff Johnson. He appeared in 27 games with New York that season, finishing with a 3.07 ERA.

Following the 1979 season, Hood was granted free agency and he subsequently signed with the St. Louis Cardinals on March 13, 1980. He appeared in just 33 games with the Cardinals, as the club released him on October 25, 1980.

Hood then signed with the Kansas City Royals before the 1981 season and appeared in 57 games over the next two seasons. His final major league appearance came on October 2, 1983 at Oakland–Alameda County Coliseum, in an 8–4 Royals' loss.

References

External links
, or Retrosheet, or Pura Pelota (Venezuelan Winter League)

1949 births
Living people
Baltimore Orioles players
Baseball players from South Carolina
Bluefield Orioles players
Cleveland Indians players
Dallas–Fort Worth Spurs players
Florida Instructional League Orioles players
Fort Myers Sun Sox players
Kansas City Royals players
Major League Baseball pitchers
Navegantes del Magallanes players
American expatriate baseball players in Venezuela
New York Yankees players
Omaha Royals players
Sportspeople from Florence, South Carolina
Rochester Red Wings players
St. Louis Cardinals players
Stockton Ports players
Tigres de Aragua players